The E. L. Thorndike Career Achievement Awards is an award of the American Psychological Association given to living recipients for substantial career achievements in educational psychology. The award's winners are recognized for research in the best tradition of educational psychology, meaning that the award is conferred for original, scientific, empirically-based research that contributes significantly to knowledge, theory, or practice in educational psychology. It was named for the noted psychologist, Edward Thorndike.

Recipients
Source: America Psychological Association and APA Division 15 

2021 Daniel Schwartz
2020 Thomas L Good
2019 Steve Graham
2018 Joanna P. Williams
2017 Robert Slavin
2016 Edward Haertel
2015 Michelene Chi
2014 Stephen J. Ceci
2013 Sandra Graham
2012 Keith Stanovich
2011 Barry Zimmerman
2010 Richard Shavelson
2009 Carol Dweck
2008 Bernard Weiner
2007 Jere Brophy
2006 Patricia Alexander
2005 Jacquelynne S. Eccles
2004 G. Michael Pressley
2003 Robert J. Sternberg
2002 Joel Levin
2001 John Bransford
2000 Richard E. Mayer
1999 Albert Bandura
1998 Lauren Resnick
1997 Richard C. Anderson
1996 David Berliner
1995 Lee Shulman
1994 James Greeno
1993 Samuel Messick
1992 Robert Linn
1991 Herbert Klausmeier
1990 Richard E. Snow
1989 Frank Farley
1988 Wilbert J. McKeachie
1987 Merlin Wittrock
1986 Nathaniel Gage
1985 Ernst Rothkopf
1984 Anne Anastasi
1983 Jeanne Chall
1982 Robert Glaser
1981 Jerome Bruner
1980 Richard C. Atkinson
1979 Patrick Suppes
1978 Julian Stanley
1977 David Ausubel
1976 Jean Piaget
1975 Joy P. Guilford
1974 Robert M. Gagne
1973 Benjamin S. Bloom
1972 John C. Flanagan
1971 Robert L. Thorndike
1970 John B. Carroll
1969 Robert J. Havighurst
1968 Cyril Burt
1967 Lee Cronbach
1966 Burrhus F. Skinner
1965 William A. Brownell
1964 Sidney L. Pressey

See also
Spearman Medal
Bruno Klopfer Award
List of psychology awards
List of awards named after people

References 

Career awards
American psychology awards
American Psychological Association
Educational psychology